The Roman Catholic Diocese of San Francisco de Macorís (erected 16 January 1978) is a suffragan diocese of the Archdiocese of Santiago de los Caballeros.

Bishops
Ordinaries
Nicolás de Jesús López Rodríguez (16 January 1978 – 15 November 1981)
Jesús María de Jesús Moya (20 April 1984 – 31 May 2012)
Fausto Ramón Mejía Vallejo (31 May 2012 – 15 May 2021)
Ramón Alfredo de la Cruz Baldera (15 May 2021 – present)

Other priests of this diocese who became bishops
Julio César Corniel Amaro, appointed Bishop of Puerto Plata in 2005
Andrés Napoleón Romero Cárdenas, appointed Bishop of Barahona in 2015
Francisco Ozoria Acosta,  appointed Archbishop of Santo Domingo in 2016

External links and references

San Francisco de Macoris
San Francisco de Macorís
San Francisco de Macorís
San Francisco de Macorís, Roman Catholic Diocese of